2235 may refer to: 

Marantz 2235, a stereo receiver produced during the 1970s 
2235, a year in the 23rd century
See 2000 (number) for 2235